George McDuffie (August 10, 1790 – March 11, 1851) was the 55th Governor of South Carolina and a member of the United States Senate.

Biography
Born of modest means in McDuffie County, Georgia, McDuffie's extraordinary intellect was noticed while clerking at a store in Augusta, Georgia. The Calhoun family sponsored his education at Moses Waddel's famous Willington Academy, where he established an outstanding reputation.  Graduating from South Carolina College in 1813, he was admitted to the bar in 1814, and went into partnership with Eldred Simkins at Edgefield. Rising rapidly, he served in the South Carolina General Assembly in 1818–1821, and in the United States House of Representatives in 1821–1834. In 1834 he became a major general of the South Carolina Militia.

In 1821 he published a pamphlet in which strict states' rights were strongly denounced; yet in 1832 he became one of the greater nullifiers. The change seems to have been gradual, and to have been determined in part by the influence of John C. Calhoun. When, after 1824, the old Democratic-Republican party split into factions, he followed Andrew Jackson and Martin Van Buren in opposing the Panama Congress and the policy of making Federal appropriations for internal improvements. He did not hesitate, however, to differ from Jackson on the two chief issues of his administration: the Bank and nullification.

In 1832 he was a prominent member of the South Carolina Nullification Convention, and drafted its address to the people of the United States. He served as governor in 1834–1836, during which time he helped to reorganize South Carolina College. From January 1843 until January 1846 he was a member of the United States Senate. The leading Democratic measures of those years all received his hearty support. McDuffie, like Calhoun, became an eloquent champion of state sovereignty; but while Calhoun emphasized state action as the only means of redressing a grievance, McDuffie paid more attention to the grievance itself. Influenced in large measure by Thomas Cooper, he made it his special work to convince the people of the South that the downfall of protection was essential to their material progress. In opposing the 1828 Tariff of Abominations he used the illustration that forty bales of every one hundred went to pay tariffs and therefore Northern interests. His argument that it is the producer who really pays the duty of imports has been called the economic basis of nullification.

In 1822, mirroring the political confrontation between Calhoun of South Carolina and William H. Crawford of Georgia, McDuffie fought a series of duels with Colonel William Cumming. He suffered serious wounds that ultimately led to his death and were said by O'Neall to "change the whole character of his disposition... all who knew him afterwards are obliged to admit his great irritability". O'Neall went on to say that "McDuffie was in youth, manhood and old age, a remarkable man for his taciturnity and reserve. He literally seemed to commune with himself; yet there were occasions, when he met with old friends and companions, in which he seemed to enjoy life with as much zest as any man." Perley Poore stated that McDuffie was a "spare, grim-looking man, who was an admirer of Milton, and who was never known to jest or smile." In a description by Sparks, "His temperament was nervous and ardent, and his feelings strong. His manner when speaking was nervous and impassioned, and at times fiercely vehement, and again persuasive and tenderly pathetic, and in every mood he was deeply eloquent." Sparks recounts McDuffie's triumph on first coming to the House, driving the madcap John Randolph from the floor with "vituperation witheringly pungent".

George McDuffie died at his estate "Cherry Hill" in Sumter County, South Carolina, on March 11, 1851. McDuffie County, Georgia, is named after him.

References

 
  pp. 463–468
  p. 81
  pp. 87–92

Further reading
 Green, Edwin. George McDuffie. Columbia: State Co., 1936.

External links
 SCIway Biography of George McDuffie
 NGA Biography of George McDuffie
 United States Congress Biography of George McDuffie

1790 births
1851 deaths
University of South Carolina alumni
South Carolina lawyers
Democratic Party members of the South Carolina House of Representatives
Democratic Party governors of South Carolina
University of South Carolina trustees
American duellists
Nullifier Party members of the United States House of Representatives
Nullifier Party politicians
Democratic Party United States senators from South Carolina
Democratic-Republican Party members of the United States House of Representatives from South Carolina
Jacksonian members of the United States House of Representatives from South Carolina
19th-century American politicians